New Zealand competed at the 2005 World Championships in Athletics held in Helsinki, Finland. They won one medal, a silver, which was won by Valerie Vili (now Valerie Adams) in the shot put. Vili originally won the bronze medal, but was upgraded to silver after original gold medallist Nadzeya Ostapchuk subsequently failed a drug test. They placed 26th on the medal table.

Entrants

Key
Q = Qualified for the next round by placing (track events) or automatic qualifying target (field events)
q = Qualified for the next round as a fastest loser (track events) or by position (field events)
AR = Area (Continental) Record
NR = National record
PB = Personal best
SB = Season best
- = Round not applicable for the event

References

Nations at the 2005 World Championships in Athletics
New Zealand at the World Championships in Athletics
World Championships in Athletics